Patrick Kielty (born 31 January 1971) is an "Irish and Northern Irish" comedian and television personality.

Background 
Kielty was born in County Down, Northern Ireland, and grew up in the village of Dundrum. He is one of three sons born to the businessman John "Jack" Kielty, who was shot dead on 25 January 1988 by the Ulster Freedom Fighters (UFF), a cover name used by loyalist paramilitary group the Ulster Defence Association (UDA). John Kielty was to have been a key witness in Central Television's defence of a libel action brought by Jim Craig, who was suing the television company over a broadcast of The Cook Report which connected him to racketeering, and is said to have ordered John Kielty's murder.

Kielty as a teenager was a talented Gaelic footballer, and was a member of the Down GAA minor football team for three years, between 1987–89. He was the substitute goalkeeper for the team when they won the 1987 All Ireland Minor Football Championship.

Career 
Kielty began performing regularly while a pupil at St Patrick's Grammar School, Downpatrick. Kielty was persuaded to take part by a Games master who spotted his impersonations of local politicians, celebrities, and sportsmen. His professional career started while he was still a psychology student at Queen's University Belfast. In 1991, along with his friend and fellow student Jackie Hamilton (later a BBC and independent producer), the pair visited Dublin's new stand up club The Gasworks run by performer/producer Billy Magra/McGrath. UK acts making their Irish debuts included Jo Brand, Lee Evans, Jack Dee, Stewart Lee, Mark Lamarr, Eddie Izzard and many more plus The Gasworks gave local acts like Sean Hughes, Jon Kenny/Pat Shortt and Ardal O'Hanlon their first headline shows in Dublin. After a successful opening spot (mainly doing impressions), Billy advised Patrick and Jackie to open their own comedy club in Belfast and The Empire on Botanic Avenue in Belfast was born. The following year Patrick was a finalist in a National Comedy Search organised by Billy for Ireland's most-watched TV programme The Late Late Show. Another finalist, also making his TV debut, was another future star, Dylan Moran. Later the experience led to a hugely successful BBC NI series The Empire Laughs Back - also produced by Jackie. One routine performed at local gigs involved donning a balaclava and making spoof paramilitary pronouncements.

In 1993, Kielty presented the show SUS on UTV. He later became the warm-up act for a BBC Northern Ireland programme, Anderson on the Box, presented by local personality Gerry Anderson. When this show was axed, he presented its replacement, PK Tonight. Although this ran for only a year and was only shown in Northern Ireland, it did attract the attention of London-based broadcasters, winning him the "Best Newcomer" Award at the 1996 Royal Television Society Awards. In 1997, he set up the Belfast-based TV production company Green Inc with TV director Stephen Stewart, making shows such as The Afternoon Show, Patrick Kielty Almost Live, and Ask Rhod Gilbert. It was reported in 2010 that Kielty had sold his share in the company. Kielty graduated to presenting programmes such as Last Chance Lottery and Patrick Kielty Almost Live, broadcast throughout the UK. Following his liver transplant, former football star George Best later gave his first TV interview to Kielty on the same show.

From 2001 to 2003, Kielty hosted 14 episodes of the comedy game show Stupid Punts. He also presented a series of After The Break. He did an impersonation of Martin McGuinness (who bore some superficial visual resemblance to Art Garfunkel) singing the Simon and Garfunkel song, "Bridge over Troubled Water".  Kielty continued to appear on national television, mostly light-entertainment shows such as the BBC's Fame Academy, Comic Relief Does Fame Academy and Love Island for ITV in both 2005 and 2006. On 21 June 2003 Kielty hosted the Opening Ceremony of the Special Olympics in Croke Park, Dublin, to a reported global audience of 800 million viewers. Other participants included Nelson Mandela, Mohammed Ali, and U2.  In 2006, he hosted a segment on ITV's coverage of The Prince's Trust 30th Birthday LIVE alongside Kate Thornton. He hosted the original pilot series of the American version of Deal or No Deal for ABC in early 2004. However, ABC decided against airing the series, which ended up on NBC, with Canadian comedian Howie Mandel as host.

In 2006, Kielty returned to the stand-up scene with a new UK tour. A DVD, filmed at Belfast's Grand Opera House, was later released. In 2007, he began work at the Trafalgar Theatre in London's West End on the UK production of  A Night in November, written by Northern Irish dramatist Marie Jones (Stones in His Pockets). He debuted in the play at the Grand Opera House in Belfast.

In 2007, he also guested on the BBC's third series of Live at the Apollo. On 18 May 2007, Kielty was invited to conduct a joint in-depth TV interview at 10 Downing Street in London with UK Prime Minister Tony Blair and Irish Taoiseach Bertie Ahearn to discuss the Northern Ireland peace process. He hosted the Saturday morning show on BBC Radio 2 which started on 24 July 2010 and it ran for 10 weeks. Kielty presented Sport Relief in 2010 and 2012 alongside Fearne Cotton.

Kielty was the host of the first series of Channel 4's Stand Up for the Week, which began in June 2010 and ran for six weeks.

In 2012, he co-presented This Morning, alongside Kate Thornton for one episode and Emma Willis for three episodes.  In 2014 and 2015, Patrick guest hosted a few episodes of The One Show alongside Alex Jones.

In 2016 Kielty returned to BBC Northern Ireland to present programmes, including the comedy panel game show Bad Language alongside Susan Calman and Paul Sinha. He then hosted television documentary Patrick Kielty's Mulholland Drive which focused on the life of William Mullholland and the California Water Wars. Kielty also reflected on his relatives' work in the Northern Irish water industry.  In March 2016 he began hosting a chat show for BBC NI called Delete, Delete, Delete looking at celebrities' internet history.

In 2016, he presented Debatable, a daily quiz show for BBC Two.

In 2018, Kielty presented a documentary, My Dad, the Peace Deal and Me for BBC Two. The programme, coinciding with the 20th anniversary of the Good Friday Agreement, explored the state of Northern Ireland two decades on from the Agreement. Kielty discussed the killing of his father and the effect it had on him, as well as his decision to vote Yes to the Agreement in a referendum, even though it would result in the release from gaol of his father's killers. He also interviewed former paramilitary activists from both sides of the struggle, DUP leader Arlene Foster, school students at an integrated (non-denominational) school and a Richard Moore, founder of Children in Crossfire who was blinded as a small boy by a rubber bullet fired by a British soldier, whom he later befriended.

In 2021, Kielty took part in the RTÉ series All the Walks of Life, where he talked about his childhood and the values he holds. He appeared in the film Ballywalter, playing Shane, a stand-up comic.

Radio 

In January 2015, US Country star Garth Brooks gave his first UK interview to Kielty for a BBC Radio 2 special from Boston, Massachusetts. On 13 September 2019, Kielty presented The News Quiz on BBC Radio 4. In August 2020, Kielty co-presented Five Live Breakfast with Rachel Burden on BBC Radio 5 Live, sitting in for Nicky Campbell.

Stage 
Kielty performed in the play A Night in November in August 2007 in the Grand Opera House, Belfast, and also in productions in London and in 2008 in The Olympia Theatre in Dublin. A documentary about the production of the play starring Kielty was released in 2008. In 2022, he embarked on his first stand-up tour for seven years. The dad-of-two joked on motoring podcast Fuelling Around that his Borderline show gave him the perfect opportunity to catch up on some sleep.

Personal life 
Kielty married English model and television presenter Cat Deeley (his former Fame Academy co-host) in a private ceremony in Rome on Saturday 29 September 2012. Their first son was born in January 2016, and a second in June 2018. Hosting the BBC Radio 5 Live afternoon show on 28 October 2020 (sitting in for Nihal Arthanayake) he talked of his relationship with Deeley saying, "first find a woman out of your league and then convince her she isn't."

Kielty is a lifelong fan of Manchester United.

Charity 
In 2010, he took part in Channel 4's Comedy Gala, a benefit show held in aid of Great Ormond Street Children's Hospital, filmed live at the O2 Arena in London on 30 March.

Kielty has participated in every incarnation of Soccer Aid until 2016. He plays for the 'Rest of The World' team as a goalkeeper and is typically substituted onto the field at the beginning of the second half.

After co-presenting Sport Relief on two occasions in 2010 and 2012, Kielty's participation in 2015's Comic Relief telethon was confirmed when British boy band One Direction tweeted a short clip announcing who would be playing them in a 'No Direction' tribute for Red Nose Day. Kielty, who impersonated Niall Horan, directed the skit in which comedians Jack Dee played Louis Tomlinson, Nick Helm became Zayn Malik, Vic Reeves took on Harry Styles and Johnny Vegas transformed into Liam Payne.

Filmography 
Television presenting
Last Chance Lottery
Patrick Kielty Almost Live
After the Break
Fame Academy
Love Island
Deal or No Deal (unaired ABC Pilots) (2003–2004)
The Prince's Trust 30th Birthday LIVE (2006)
Comic Relief Does Fame Academy (2007)
Sport Relief (2010, 2012)
Stand Up for the Week (2010)
This Morning Summer (2012)
The One Show (2014—)
Bad Language (2016)
Patrick Kielty's Mulholland Drive (2016)
Delete, Delete, Delete (2016—)
Debatable (2016–2017)
Patrick Kielty: One Hundred Years of Union (2021)

DVDs
Don't Shoot, I've Got a Bomb (1995)
Get Up, Stand Up (1998)
Patrick Kielty – Live (2006)
Patrick Kielty's Mulholland Drive (2016)

Other

 My Dad, the Peace Deal and Me (2018)

References

External links 
 Official website
 
 Patrick Kielty (BBC Radio 5 Live)
 https://web.archive.org/web/20080420095450/http://www.spectator.co.uk/the-magazine/features/292571/a-child-of-the-troubles-with-a-smile-on-his-face.thtml
 Unreality TV – Patrick Kielty on Celebrity Love Island News, Gossip and Chat

1971 births
Living people
Alumni of Queen's University Belfast
BBC Radio 5 Live presenters
Down Gaelic footballers
Dundrum Gaelic footballers
People educated at St Patrick's Grammar School, Downpatrick
People from County Down
Television presenters from Northern Ireland
Irish male comedians
Male comedians from Northern Ireland
Stand-up comedians from Northern Ireland
Satirists from Northern Ireland
Humorists from Northern Ireland
UTV (TV channel)
Television writers from Northern Ireland
20th-century comedians from Northern Ireland
21st-century comedians from Northern Ireland